Sergey Stanev (born 9 September 1988) is a Bulgarian footballer of Ukrainian descent, who currently plays for Kaliakra Kavarna as a forward.

His career started in 1995 at Chernomorets Football Club, Ukraine, where he had been till 2000. Over the course of the next 3 years he played for Spartak Varna. During season 2002/03 14-year old Sergey scored 71 goals for the junior team of Spartak. At the age of 15, because of his good displays, he relocated to Germany, in junior school of FC Sachsen Leipzig. Stanev returned to Bulgaria and from 2003 till 2006 played for Naftex Burgas. In 2007, he moved to Lokomotiv Plovdiv, signing a three-year contract. In October 2007 Sergey was loaned out to Brestnik 1948. In this period, for three months Stanev earned 9 appearances playing in the Bulgarian V AFG, scored seven goals and provided five assists. In 2008 Stanev played for Sportist Svoge in the Bulgarian second division. On 23 February 2009, Spartak Varna signed Stanev to a three-year deal. He was given the number 17 shirt. Sergey made his team debut one day later, in a 3-0 friendly win against amateur FC Aksakovo.

References

External links
  footmercato profile

1988 births
Living people
Bulgarian footballers
First Professional Football League (Bulgaria) players
Association football forwards
Sportspeople from Varna, Bulgaria
PFC Spartak Varna players
PFC Kaliakra Kavarna players